Wang Nan may refer to:

Wang Nan (judoka) (born 1970), Chinese judoka
Wang Nan (sport shooter) (born 1978), male Chinese sports shooter
Wang Nan (table tennis) (born 1978), female Chinese table tennis player
Wang Nan (baseball) (born 1981), Chinese baseball player

Wang Nan (speed skater) (born 1987), Chinese male speed skater
Wang Nan (ice hockey) (born 1988), Chinese female ice hockey player
Wang Nan (canoeist), Chinese female canoeist